Lewisham North may refer to:
Lewisham North (UK Parliament constituency)
Lewisham North (Scout District)